The 2003 Oakville municipal elections took place on 10 November 2003, to elect a Regional Government chair and a Town mayor and 6 Town Councillors and 6 Town and Regional Councillors in Oakville, Canada.

Oakville elects two councillors from each of six wards to its Town Council for a total of 13, including the Mayor. Each ward elects one of its two councillors to serve also on the 21 member Council of the Regional Government of the Municipality of Halton. The Mayor of Oakville is a voting member of both Councils. The other members of the Halton Council come from Burlington (7), Milton (3) and Halton Hills (3), plus the directly elected at large Chair of the Region.

In addition, school trustees were elected to the Halton District Public School Board, Halton District Catholic School Board, Conseil scolaire de district du Centre-Sud-Ouest and Conseil scolaire de district catholique Centre-Sud. These elections ran in conjunction with those in all other municipalities across the province of Ontario (see 2003 Ontario municipal elections).

The close results precipitated a court battle for a recount and presaged a rematch 3 years later that reversed the results the recount upheld.

Town Mayor & Town Council Member (1 of 13) & Regional Councillor (1 of 21) 

Town (6 of 13) & Regional Councils (6 of 21)

Town Council - (6 of 13)

2003 Ontario municipal elections
Municipal government of Oakville, Ontario